Letizia Paternoster (born 22 July 1999) is an Italian road and track cyclist, who rides for UCI Women's WorldTeam .

In October 2017, she won gold in the team pursuit at the 2017 UEC European Track Championships in Berlin. In April 2018, she won the Gran Premio della Liberazione in Rome, her first professional road race victory. Two days later, she started in the Festival Elsy Jacobs, a three-day stage event in Luxembourg, and claimed the final stage and the general classification. Actor Peter Facinelli is her uncle.

Major results

Road

2016
1st Stage 1 (ITT) Albstadt-Frauen-Etappenrennen
2nd Road race, National Junior Road Championships
3rd Trofeo Da Moreno–Piccolo Trofeo Alfredo Binda
4th Road race, UEC European Junior Road Championships
5th Road race, UCI Junior World Road Championships

2017
National Junior Road Championships
1st  Road race
1st  Time trial
UEC European Junior Road Championships
2nd Time trial
3rd Road race
3rd Road race, UCI Junior Road World Championships
3rd Gran Premio Beghelli Internazionale Donne Elite
4th GP della Liberazione PINK
4th Trofeo Da Moreno–Piccolo Trofeo Alfredo Binda

2018
1st  Overall GP Elsy Jacobs
1st  Points classification
1st  Young rider classification
1st Stage 2
1st GP della Liberazione PINK
3rd Road race, UEC European Under-23 Road Championships

2019
1st  European U23 Championship Road Race
1st Stage 1 Women's Tour Down Under
3rd Gent–Wevelgem

Classics results timeline

Track

2016
UCI Junior World Championships
1st  Points race
1st  Team pursuit
UEC European Junior Championships
1st  Team pursuit
1st  Points race
1st  Scratch race

2017
 1st  Team pursuit, UEC European Championships
UEC European Junior Championships
1st  Team pursuit
1st  Individual pursuit
1st  Elimination race
1st  Omnium
1st  Madison
Track Cycling Challenge
2nd Madison (with Maria Giulia Confalonieri)
2nd Omnium

2018
International Belgian Track Meeting
2nd Points Race
3rd Madison (with Marta Cavalli)

2019
U23 UEC European Track Championships
1st  Team pursuit
1st  Madison
1st European Games Team pursuit
1st UCI Track World Cup – Hong Kong, Team pursuit
2nd UCI World Track Championships (Omnium)
UCI Track World Cup – Cambridge
2nd Madison
3rd Team pursuit
UCI Track World Cup – Minsk
2nd Omnium
3rd Team pursuit
European Track Championships
3rd Team pursuit

2020
UCI World Track Championships
2nd Omnium
3rd Madison
UCI Track World Cup – Milton
2nd Omnium

2021 
UCI World Track Championships
1st  Elimination race
2nd Team pursuit
3rd National Track Championships (Madison)

References

External links

 
 
 
 
 
 

1999 births
Living people
Italian female cyclists
Italian track cyclists
Sportspeople from Trentino
Cyclists at the 2019 European Games
European Games medalists in cycling
European Games gold medalists for Italy
Olympic cyclists of Italy
Cyclists at the 2020 Summer Olympics
Cyclists from Trentino-Alto Adige/Südtirol
People from Cles
21st-century Italian women